The National Centre for Public Administration and Local Government it is the strategic agency of Greece for the training and education of public servants and local government employees. It was established in 1983, and it is a Public Legal Entity supervised by the Minister of Interior. 

It comprises the National School of Public Administration and Local Government (ESDDA), Training Institute (INEP) and the Documentation, Research and Innovation Institute (ITEK).

Purpose 
Its main mission is the development of the Human Resources of the Public Administration and Local Government, the creation a body of specialized officials of the Public Administration with comprehensive professional training about the staffing of central administration, state regional administration and local government, the improvement of the functioning of the public services and of the public agents through research on the documentation and through consulting support, life-long learning through certified training.

Administration 
The administration bodies of EKDDA are: the President, the Vice President and the Administration Board, consisting of EKDDA President, EKDDA Vice President, the Directors of the Educational and Scientific Units of EKDDA, the Head of the General Directorate of Human Resources Management of the Public Sector of the Ministry of Interior, five Experts and the representatives of the Association of Greek Regions (ENPE in Greek), the Central Union of the Municipalities of Greece (KEDE in Greek), the Greek Civil Servants’ Confederation (ADEDY in Greek), the Hellenic Association of the Employees of Local Government Organizations (POE-OTA in Greek) and the Graduates’ Association from the National School of Public Administration and Local Government (ESDDA in Greek).

Studies  
Students of the current Educational Series of ESDDA come from Legal, Humanitarian, Financial, Political, Science Schools and Technical University Schools. Apart from the courses, in the framework of the Curriculum, educational actions, visits, lectures, meetings and other acts relating to special topics of the programme and/or interdisciplinary and innovative approaches to Public Administration issues are carried out. The internship of ESDDA students is an integral part of the educational process. It is held in public bodies and bodies of the broader public sector in Greece and abroad and its aim is to familiarize the students with the work flow in the specific services. The School’s students are obliged, in the framework of the Curriculum, to prepare a thesis and get into traineeship in public bodies and services. Each employee has the right to submit two participation applications per semester and attend up to three training programs per year. 

Training Institute (INEP) has training programs in the following: 
 Public Administration & Governance
 Economy & Fiscal Policy
 Human Rights & Social Policy
 Sustainable Development
 Information Science & Digital Services
 Cultural & Tourist Development

ESDDA curriculum is structured along five fields:
 1st Field:  Law
 2nd Field: Economy
 3rd Field: Public Administration
 4th Field: Digital Governance
 5th Field: Foreign languages

See also
 Minister of Interior  
 Education in Greece

References

Further reading

External links
    
   
   via eTranslation Digital Europe Programme
    

Government agencies of Greece
1983 establishments in Greece